Benjamin Tollerene (born December 20, 1986) is an American professional poker player who specializes in Omaha hold 'em.

Poker career
Tollerene specializes in online high-stakes, but also plays live tournaments, winning over $2,600,000 as of 2017. Tollerene said he lost $1.7 million to Viktor Blom in one night before winning it all back in the next 24 hours.

Tollerene earned over $3,800,000 playing on PokerStars under the alias Ben86 and won over $7,400,000 on Full Tilt Poker playing under the alias Bttech86.

As of 2018, Tollerene has cashed for over $6,700,000 in live poker tournaments.

References

External links
 
 Ben Tollerene Hendon Mob profile

American poker players
Living people
1986 births